
Year 784 (DCCLXXXIV) was a leap year starting on Thursday  of the Julian calendar. The denomination 784 for this year has been used since the early medieval period, when the Anno Domini calendar era became the prevalent method in Europe for naming years.

Events 
 By place 
 Europe 
 Saxon Wars: King Charlemagne begins a campaign in northern Saxony. He ravages Eastphalian territory as far as the Elbe River, while his son, Charles the Younger, defeats a Saxon force in the Lippe Valley. Bad weather hinders Charlemagne's winter campaign in southern Saxony.
 Winter – Charlemagne returns to Eresburg and builds a church, probably on the site of the Irminsul (a pagan religious site). Frankish forces based at Eresburg attack rebel Saxon settlements, and take control of the roads. Charlemagne himself takes part in some of these raids.

 Arabian Empire 
 Abd al-Rahman I, Muslim emir of Córdoba (Al-Andalus), begins the construction of the Prayer Hall of the Great Mosque of Córdoba. He uses the mosque (originally called Aljama Mosque) as an adjunct to his palace, and names it in honour of his wife.

 Asia 
 The Japanese begin a war against the Ainu, in the north, on the main island of Honshu. Emperor Kanmu wishes to be free from the influence of the Buddhist monasteries around Nara (then called Heijō), and moves the capital to Nagaoka, ending the Nara period.
 Nagaoka-kyō becomes the Japanese imperial capital.

 Central America 
February 4 – Itzamnaaj K'awiil, brother of Bat K'awiil (who reigned between 780 and 784) and the son of K'ahk' Ukalaw Chan Chaak (who ruled 755 to 780) becomes the new ruler of the Mayan city state of Naranjo in Guatemala and reigns until his death in 810.

 By topic 
 Religion 
 August 30 – Paul IV abdicates as patriarch of Constantinople.
 December 25 – Tarasios is elected patriarch of Constantinople.

Births 
 Ibn Sa'd al-Baghdadi, Muslim historian (d. 845)
 Li Jue, chancellor of the Tang Dynasty (approximate date)
 Theodrada, Frankish princess and abbess, daughter of Charlemagne (approximate date)

Deaths 
 May 4 – Arbeo, bishop of Freising
 July 16 – Fulrad, Frankish abbot (b. 710)
 August 21 – Alberic, archbishop of Utrecht
 Autpert Ambrose, Frankish abbot
 Isa ibn Musa, Muslim governor (or 783)
 Paul IV, patriarch of Constantinople
 Vergilius, bishop of Salzburg

References

Sources